Avalanche is an arcade video game designed by Dennis Koble and released by Atari, Inc. in 1978. The object is to catch falling rocks with a controllable set of paddles that diminish in number and size as the rocks fall faster and faster.
The concept gained a much wider audience after Activision released an unauthorized adaptation in 1981 as Kaboom! for the Atari 2600.
The only official home port of Avalanche is for the Atari 8-bit family.

Gameplay
Avalanche is for 1 or 2 players, alternating turns. There are six rows of rocks at the top of the screen. The game starts with a six-storied platform and the player loses one platform per row of rocks cleared. The player scores points for those rocks they prevent from reaching the ground. The farther the row of rocks, the smaller and faster they become. The ultimate goal is to get enough points so that the player can continue the game should they lose their first one.

Development
According to the manual for the Atari home computer version, Avalanche started out as a game about eggs and baskets called Catch. The game tested poorly, but was better received when the theme was changed to falling rocks.

Avalanche is housed in a custom cabinet that includes two large lit start buttons and a rotary controller. The side art and bezel feature groupings of rocks with extending lines meant to convey the motion of falling rocks. The screen is black and white with two colored strips to provide colored rows of graphics as in Breakout.

The circuit board is based on the 6502 CPU, with game code stored in multiple ROMs.  All game text is selectable to 4 different languages: English, French, German, or Spanish. Avalanche also includes a built-in self-test diagnostic program that displays all microprocessor and memory functions, including all operator switches and functions.

Ports
Dennis Koble's official port of Avalanche for the Atari 8-bit computers was published through the Atari Program Exchange in 1981 instead of official Atari channels. It requires the paddle controller.

Legacy
Avalanche inspired many similar games including Kaboom! by Activision, Lost Luggage, and Eggomania, all for the Atari 2600. Chicken for the Atari 8-bit family and Popcorn for the TRS-80 Color Computer are others.

References

External links

Avalanche at Atari Mania

1978 video games
Action video games
Arcade video games
Atari arcade games
Atari 8-bit family games
Atari Program Exchange software
Video games developed in the United States